Mountain Family Robinson is a 1979 family movie that stars Robert Logan, Susan Damante-Shaw and George Buck Flower. This film is a sequel to The Adventures of the Wilderness Family and The Further Adventures of the Wilderness Family and, like its predecessors, was filmed in the states of Colorado and Utah (though it was set in Canada).

Plot
In the third and final film, the Robinsons celebrate the arrival of spring after surviving a fierce winter. Soon their happiness is quickly dashed, as a Forest Service ranger informs them they must prove their mountain home is located on a legitimate mining claim or they must move out. Also, Pat finds out that her mother is ill and decides to go back to Los Angeles. Will the Robinsons lose their mountain home? Will Pat come back from the city?

Main cast
Robert Logan as Skip Robinson
Susan Damante-Shaw as Pat Robinson
Heather Rattray as Jenny Robinson
Ham Larsen as Toby Robinson
George Buck Flower as Boomer
William Bryant as Forest Ranger

Production
Parts of the film were shot in Colorado as well as the Uinta National Forest in Utah.

DVD details
Release date: January 1, 2003
Full Screen
Region: 1
Aspect Ratio: 1.33:1
Audio tracks: English
Subtitles: English, Spanish
Running time: 100 minutes

See also 

 The Adventures of the Wilderness Family
 The Further Adventures of the Wilderness Family

References

External links
 
 
 
 Official Site
 Movie Trailer for TV

1979 films
American children's adventure films
American children's drama films
1970s adventure drama films
1970s English-language films
Films shot in Utah
Films shot in Colorado
Films scored by Robert O. Ragland
1979 drama films
1970s American films